Molissa Fenley (born 15 November 1954) is an American choreographer, performer and teacher of contemporary dance.

Early life and education
Molissa Fenley (née Avril Molissa Fenley) was born in Las Vegas, Nevada on November 15, 1954. She is the youngest of three children born to Eileen Allison Walker and John Morris Fenley. At the age of six months Fenley and her family moved to Ithaca, NY where her father was a professor of Agricultural Extension at Cornell University. At the age of six, her family moved to Ibadan, Nigeria where her father worked for the US State Department's USAID program. Fenley attended high school in Spain, and at 16 returned to the US where she received her BA in Dance from Mills College in 1975. Immediately after graduating from Mills, Fenley moved to New York City to begin her career as a choreographer and dancer.

Career

Early career
Upon arriving in New York City in 1975, Fenley trained with Merce Cunningham, Viola Farber and studied at the Erick Hawkins School. During her first years in New York Fenley danced for several choreographers including Carol Conway and Andrew deGroat. She began creating her own work and formed Molissa Fenley and Dancers in 1977. After a tour of European festivals in 1980 her work began to receive more critical attention in the United States and abroad. 
Her early career (1977–1987) was focused on presenting ensemble work. Fenley and her dancers displayed remarkable stamina through complex patterning and sustained passages of intense speed, exemplified in works such as Energizer (1980). In addition to more traditional dance classes, Fenley and her dancers did workouts that included running, calisthenics and weight training in order to achieve the strength and endurance needed to execute her physically demanding choreography.  Fenley has maintained this aesthetic of athletic virtuosity throughout her career.

Solo Work
In 1987 she disbanded her ensemble and made a shift to performing solo works, often in collaboration with visual artists including Kiki Smith, Richard Long and Tatsuo Miyajima and composers such as Philip Glass, Laurie Anderson, Pauline Oliveros. It was during this period that she created her seminal work, State of Darkness (1988), which was commissioned by the American Dance Festival in Durham, N.C. Set to Igor Stravinsky's Le Sacre du Printemps, this 35 minute solo received critical acclaim for both its physical rigor, innovative use of Stravinsky's score and intense sense of ritual drama. Fenley reconstructed State of Darkness in 1999 at the request of New York City Ballet principal dancer Peter Boal, and again in 2007 for Pacific Northwest Ballet. State of Darkness received a Bessie Award for both Fenley's original performance in 1989 and for Boal's reconstruction in 1999.

Current Work
After a decade of solo work, Fenley began creating ensemble pieces performed by herself and her company. She continues to create and perform in the United States and abroad. Fenley has maintained a long-time collaboration with composer Philip Glass and continues to collaborate with visual artists, composers and writers. Recent works include The Vessel Stories (2011), choreographed to music by Glass and featured at the Days and Nights Festival in Carmel, CA, and Credo in Us (2011) set to the John Cage piece of the same name and performed at the Mills College Art Museum and the Judson Memorial Church in New York City. 
Over the course of her career Fenley has created over 90 works, which have been presented in the United States, South America, Europe, Australia, India, Indonesia, Japan, Korea, Singapore, Taiwan and Hong Kong. Her work has been commissioned by the Bill T. Jones/Arnie Zane Dance Company, Seattle Dance Project, Marymount Manhattan College, The American Dance Festival, Deutsche Opera Ballet of Berlin, Robert Moses' Kin, The Foundation for Contemporary Performance Arts, the William Hale Harkness Foundation, The New National Theater, Tokyo, The Ohio Ballet, Australian Dance Theater, The Brooklyn Academy of Music, Barnard/Columbia, Repertory Dance Theater, Oakland Ballet, and Jacob's Pillow Dance Festival. In 2015 Seagull Press/University of Chicago published Rhythm Field: The Dance of Molissa Fenley about her life and work. She has created over 90 works since founding her company Molissa Fenley and Dancers in 1977. Recent works in include: Archeology in Reverse and Artifact in 2018,  Untitled (Haiku) and Some phrases I'm hoping Andy would like in 2019, and The Cut Outs (Matisse) in 2020 with longtime collaborator and poet Bob Holman on   In 2020, Fenley revisited her 1988 work State of Darkness, setting the solo on Jared Brown, Lloyd Knight, Sara Mearns, Shamel Pitts, Annique Roberts, Cassandra Trenary and Michael Trusnovec.

Recognition and Professional Affiliations
Fenley's contribution to her field has been recognized with awards in the United States and internationally.  She is an eleven-time recipient of the National Endowment for the Arts Choreography Fellowship. Fenley received a Bessie Award for Choreography in 1985 for her work Cenotaph and again in 1988 for State of Darkness. Fenley received a 2000 Foundation for Contemporary Arts Grants to Artists Award. She is a Guggenheim Fellow (2008), a Fellow of the American Academy in Rome (2008) and recipient of the American Masterpieces Initiative from the National Endowment of the Arts (2010).
Fenley is a member of many professional arts organizations such as the Atlantic Center for the Arts, American Dance Guild, Asian Cultural Council, CHIME Mentorship program, Dance USA, International Dance Council and New York Live Arts. She is the Executive Director of the Momenta Foundation which she founded in 1986.
Mills College and Higher Education Teaching
In addition to being one of Mills College's most esteemed alumna, Fenley worked as a professor in Mills College Dance Department faculty from 1999 to 2020. She began as a Distinguished Visiting Professor in 1999 and became an Associate Professor of Dance in 2006. She was made Full Professor in 2013. Fenley taught courses in technique, choreography and oversaw MFA candidates' thesis projects. Additionally, Fenley often set work on Mills College's Repertory Dance Company. She was awarded the Mills College Sarlo Excellence in Teaching Award in 2011. Extensive archives from Fenley's career are held at the F.W. Olin Library's Special Collections on Mills campus.
Fenley has taught as a Visiting Lecturer at New York University's Experimental Theater Wing, University of Georgia at Athens and University of Utah. She worked as a Resident Artist for the Baryshnikov Arts Center, The Atlantic Center for the Arts, The American Academy in Rome, Bard College, The Hotchkiss School, The Asian Cultural Council in Tokyo, Yaddo, the Bogliasco Foundation, Djerassi, and Harvard University. She has taught repertory workshops at Bennington College, Barnard/Columbia and Hunter College.

Personal life
Fenley resides in New York, NY and Ventura County, CA. She is married to painter Roy Fowler.

Major works

The Cut-Outs (Matisse) (2020), Created in collaboration with poet Bob Holman and composer Keith Patchell

Some phrases I'm hoping Andy would like (2019), Choreographed as a tribute to the late choreographer Andrew de Groat

 Untitled (Haiku) (2019), Created in collaboration with poet Joy Harjo and composer Larry Mitchell

 Artifact (2018), Created for dancer Peiling Kao. This work premiered as part of Kao's solo works concert Honolulu, HI.

Archeology in Reverse (2018), Created in collaboration with artist Catherine Wagner. Video and sound by Michael Mersereau.

Circadian Rhythm (2016), created in collaboration with visual artist Robert Gaylor with music by Peter Garland

Rue Surf (2016), collaboration with poet Bob Holman and artist Roy Fowler

Water Table (2016), a work in 8 parts: 
Parts 1 and 2 – The Third Coast, music by Ryuichi Sakamoto
Part 3 – Baffin Island, music by Ryuichi Sakamoto
Part 4 – Sargasso Sea
Part 5 – The Pattern of the Surface, music by Philip Glass
Part 6 – On the Other Ocean, music by David Behrman
Part 7 – Amdo, music by Ulfur Hansson 
Part 8 – Mali, music by Laetitia Sonami

Seven (2015), commissioned by Dana and Shinichi Iova-Koga as part of 95 Rituals for Anna Halprin

Dance an Impossible Space (2014), music composed and performed by Erin Gee

Redwood Park, Part 1 (2014), commissioned by the Oakland Ballet, music composed by Joan Jeanrenaud

Redwood Park, part 2 (2014)

Esperanto (2014), reconstructed by Christiana Axelsen and Molissa Fenley, music by Ryuichi Sakamoto

Entrance (2014), duet for Christiana Axelsen and Molissa Fenley, music by David Behrman

BEAMS (2014), music by Alvin Curran

Horizon, (2013), music by Pauline Oliveros

Found Object (2012), collaboration with Peiling Kao

Cross Bridge, (2012), collaboration with Holley Farmer, John Jesurun, David Moodey and Rosemary Quinn

Credo In Us, (2011), music by John Cage. Commissioned by the Mills College Art Museum
 
The Vessel Stories (2011), music by Philip Glass

The Prop Dances (2010) 
Pieces of Land, props by Jene Highstein, music by Jason Hoopes
94 Feathers, props by Merrill Wagner, music by Cenk Ergün
Mass Balance, prop by Todd Richmond, music by Cenk Ergün
Planes in Air, props by Roy Fowler, music by Joan Jeanrenaud
Prop Dance #5, props by Keith Sonnier, music by Lainie Fefferman

Regions (Revival), (2010), set by Roy Fowler, with music by Maggi Payne

Double Beginning (2009), with spoken word by Bob Holman

Ice, Dew, Food, Crew, Ape (2009), with music by Alvin Curran

Cosmati Variations (2008), with music by John Cage

Calculus and Politics (2007), with music by Harry Partch. Commissioned by The Joyce Theater

Four Lines, (2006), with music by Jon Gibson
 
Dreaming Awake, (2006), with music by Philip Glass. Commissioned by the Rovereto Music Festival, Rovereto, Italy

Patterns and Expectations, (2006), with music by Fred Frith

Desert Sea, (2005), with music by Lou Harrison.  Commissioned by Repertory Dance Theatre, Salt Lake City, Utah

Lava Field, (2004), with music by John Bischoff

Kuro Shio, (2003), with music by Bun Ching Lam. Commissioned by Women in Dance/Seoul, Korea and Tokyo, Japan

Water Courses (2003), with music by Joy Harjo

Waiting For Rain (2003), with music by Robert Ashley, set by Roy Fowler.  Commissioned by Peter Boal

331 Steps (2002), with music by Laetitia Sonami, set by Merrill Wagner

Short Stories (2002), with music by Anthony Davis and in silence, costumes by Chado

Signs/Landmark (2001), with music by Somei Satoh. Commissioned by the New National Theater, Tokyo
 
Folds (2001), with music by Fred Frith, choreographed in collaboration with Bebe Miller. Commissioned by Virginia Commonwealth University
 
Ceremony(2000), text by Joy Harjo

Spring Waterfall (2000), music by Philip Glass and Foday Musa Suso

Island (2000), with music by Harold Meltzer, artwork by Carol Hepper

I and You Resemble Each Other, Now (2000), with music by Somei Satoh

Delta (2000), music by John Cage

Weathering  (2000), with set by Merrill Wagner

Voices (1999), music by Kevin Volans, with cellist Joan Jeanrenaud

Timbral Inventions (1999), music by John Cage

Tala (1999), with music by John Cage. La Muse Menagére (1998) with music by Darius Milhaud

Icho (1997) music by Leroy Jenkins, commissioned by Felicia Norton

On the Other Ocean (1997) with music by David Behrman

Trace (1997) with composer Jonathan Hart Makwaia, painter Roy Fowler and writer John Jesurun. Commissioned by The Joyce Theater

Latitudes(1996), a work created for the internet, commissioned by the Dia Art Foundation

Pola'a (1996) with music by Lou Harrison. Commissioned by Jacob's Pillow

Regions (1995) with music by Maggi Payne. Commissioned by the 92nd Street Y

Savanna (1995) with music by Peter Garland. Commissioned by Peggy Baker Dance Projects

Sita (1995) with composer Philip Glass and photographer Sandi Fellman. Commissioned by The Joyce Theater
 
Jalan Jalan (1994), music by Lou Harrison

Bridge of Dreams (1994) with composer Laurie Anderson and visual artist Kiki Smith. Commissioned by the Deutsche Oper Berlin

Witches' Float (1993) with composer Alvin Lucier and visual artist Kiki Smith. Commissioned by the Krannert Art Center

Sightings (1993) with composer Pauline Oliveros and sculptor Tatsuo Miyajima

Nullarbor (1993) with composer Robert Lloyd and sculptor Richard Long

Channel (1993) with composer Somei Satoh and visual artist Richard Serra

Tilliboyo/Escalay (1993) with composers Foday Musa Suso and Hamza El Din

Place (1992) with music by Arvo Pärt. Commissioned by the Foundation for Contemporary Performance Arts

Threshold (1992), with music by Somei Satoh. Commissioned by The Joyce Theater

Inner Enchantments (1991), with music by Philip Glass

Bardo (1990), with music by Somei Satoh. Commissioned by Jacob's Pillow

Augury (1989) with music by Christopher Hyams-Hart, choreographed in collaboration with Doug Varone, commissioned by The American Dance Festival

The Floor Dances (1989) with composer Henryk Gorecki and sculptor Richard Long. Commissioned by the Dia Art Foundation

Provenance Unknown (1989), with composer Philip Glass. Commissioned by Dance Chance and The Kitchen for Video, Music and Dance

State of Darkness (1988), music by Igor Stravinsky. Commissioned by the American Dance Festival. Subsequently, reconstructed for Peter Boal (1999), commissioned by Lincoln Center and for the Pacific Northwest Ballet, (2007) danced in alternation by Rachel Foster, James Moore and Jonathan Porretta

In Recognition (1988), music by Philip Glass. Commissioned by Serious Fun Festival, Lincoln Center

Separate Voices (1987), a group work performed in silence. Commissioned by The Joyce Theater

A Descent into the Maelstrom (1986) music by Philip Glass, set design by Eamon D"Arcy, direction by Matthew McGuire, commissioned by the Adelaide Festival and performed by the Australian Dance Theatre

Geologic Moments (1986), with composers Philip Glass and Julius Eastman. Commissioned by the Brooklyn Academy of Music, Next Wave Festival
   
Feral (1986), music by Robert Lloyd, commissioned by the Ohio Ballet

Cenotaph (1985), with composer Jamaaladeen Tacuma and text by Eric Bogosian. Commissioned by Jacob's Pillow

Esperanto (1985), with composer Ryuichi Sakamoto. Commissioned by Tsurumoto Room, Tokyo

Hemispheres (1983), with composer Anthony Davis and visual artist Francesco Clemente. Commissioned by the Brooklyn Academy of Music, Next Wave Festival

Eureka (1982), with music by Peter Gordon. Commissioned by Dance Theater Workshop

Gentle Desire (1981), with music by Mark Freedman. Commissioned by the American Dance Festival

Peripheral Vision (1981), with music by Mark Freedman

Energizer (1980), with music by Mark Freedman. Commissioned by Dance Theater Workshop

Boca Raton (1980), extended dance mix by Paul Alexander of Talking Heads. Decor by Steven Keister

Mix (1979), Commissioned by The Kitchen for Video, Music and Dance

Video Clones (1979), video and performance work with Keith Haring

References

External links
 Molissa Fenley

American choreographers
Living people
Mills College faculty
People from Las Vegas
Mills College alumni
Bessie Award winners
1954 births
American expatriates in Nigeria
American expatriates in Spain